Philobota pilipes is a moth of the family Oecophoridae. It is known from the Australian Capital Territory, New South Wales, Queensland, South Australia and Victoria.

The larvae feed on Poaceae species. They live in a vertical silken tunnel in the soil.

References

Oecophorinae
Moths described in 1882